Frank Liivak (born 7 July 1996) is an Estonian professional footballer who plays as a forward for League of Ireland Premier Division club Sligo Rovers and the Estonia national team.

Club career

Early career
Liivak came through the youth system at Ajax affiliated Almere City FC. In August 2013, he moved to Italian club Napoli. Liivak played for the club's under-19 side in the 2013–14 UEFA Youth League.

In January 2015, Liivak joined Spanish club Alcobendas Sport. He made his senior league debut in the Tercera División on 1 February, in a 0–0 draw against Alcobendas.

Sarajevo
On 16 February 2017, Liivak signed a three-year contract with Bosnian club Sarajevo. He made his debut in the Bosnian Premier League on 4 March, in a 1–0 away victory over Olimpik.

Flora
On 29 January 2018, Liivak signed a two-year contract with Estonian club Flora. On 3 March, he made his Meistriliiga debut, in a 1–0 home win over Tulevik.

FCI Levadia
On 1 February 2021, Liivak signed a two-year contract with Flora's league rivals FCI Levadia.

Sligo Rovers
On 22 June 2022, it was announced that Liivak had signed for League of Ireland Premier Division club Sligo Rovers.

International career
Liivak began his international career for Estonia with the national under-16 team in 2011, and went on to represent the under-17, under-19, under-21, and under-23 national sides.

Liivak made his senior international debut for Estonia on 26 May 2014, in 1–1 home draw against Gibraltar in a friendly. He scored his first goal for Estonia on 1 June 2016, in the fourth minute of injury time of a 2–0 home win over Andorra.

Personal life
Liivak's father, Jaanus Liivak, is a basketball coach and a former basketball player.

Career statistics

Club

International

International goals
As of 11 October 2020. Estonia score listed first, score column indicates score after each Liivak goal.

Honours

Flora
Meistriliiga: 2019, 2020
Estonian Cup: 2019–20

FCI Levadia
Meistriliiga: 2021
Estonian Cup: 2020–21
Estonian Supercup: 2022

References

External links

1996 births
Living people
Sportspeople from Tartu
Estonian footballers
Association football forwards
Almere City FC players
S.S.C. Napoli players
Tercera División players
CD Paracuellos Antamira players
Premier League of Bosnia and Herzegovina players
FK Sarajevo players
Meistriliiga players
FC Flora players
League of Ireland players
Sligo Rovers F.C. players
Estonia youth international footballers
Estonia under-21 international footballers
Estonia international footballers
Estonian expatriate footballers
Estonian expatriate sportspeople in the Netherlands
Expatriate footballers in the Netherlands
Estonian expatriate sportspeople in Italy
Expatriate footballers in Italy
Estonian expatriate sportspeople in Spain
Expatriate footballers in Spain
Expatriate footballers in Bosnia and Herzegovina
Estonian expatriate sportspeople in Bosnia and Herzegovina
Expatriate association footballers in the Republic of Ireland
Estonian expatriate sportspeople in Ireland